Marcel Treich-Laplene (June 24, 1860 in Ussel, Corrèze, France – March 9, 1890 in Grand Bassam, Côte d'Ivoire) was the first explorer of Côte d'Ivoire and its first colonial administrator.

1860 births
1890 deaths
History of Ivory Coast
French explorers
French colonial governors and administrators
People from Ussel